Antonioni is an Italian surname. Notable people with this surname include:

 Enrica Antonioni (born 1952), Italian actress and film director, the widow of Michelangelo Antonioni
Michelangelo Antonioni (1912–2007), Italian film director and writer
Robert A. Antonioni (born 1958), American attorney and politician

See also

Antoniani
Antonioli
Antonini (name) 
Tonioli

Italian-language surnames